Centre for Entrepreneurship Opportunities and Learning, commonly known as CEOL, is a startup incubation centre situated in Mangalore city of Karnataka in India. It was launched by Nirmala Sitharaman in 2017. CEOL aims to create a Silicon Valley in the west coast of India.

Objectives 
The objectives of CEOL are
 Offer help and support to startups
 Bring in venture capital
 Bring industries to interact with startups
 Bring mentors to guide new entrepreneurs

CEOL is operated and managed by a committee headed by the Deputy Commissioner to provide young entrepreneurs the ecosystem to work on their ideas.

References 

Business incubators
Science and technology in Mangalore
Organisations based in Mangalore
Buildings and structures in Mangalore
Economy of Mangalore
2017 establishments in Karnataka